Hell and Mr. Fudge is a 2012 American drama film directed by Jeff Wood and written by Donald Davenport. Based on a true story, the film stars Mackenzie Astin as Edward Fudge, a real life Alabama preacher who has been hired to determine the nature of hell. The real life Fudge is best known for his book The Fire That Consumes, in which he argues against the immortal soul and eternal torment in hell.

Cast
 Mackenzie Astin as Edward Fudge
 Cody Sullivan as young Edward
 Keri Lynn Pratt as Sara Fudge
 John Wesley Shipp as Bennie Lee Fudge
 Eileen Davidson as Sibyl Fudge
 Wes Robertson as Joe Mark
 Trevor Allen Martin as young Joe
 Helen Ingebritsen as Mrs. Herne
 Christian Fortune as Davy Hollis
 Sean McGowan as Don Haloway
 Tom Hillmann as Simon Clarage

Production
Filming took place in Athens, Alabama in June and July 2011. The film had a scheduled release date of "first quarter 2012". Fudge cooperated in the film's development.

Reception
In April 2012, the film received a Platinum award in the "Christian theatrical feature film" category at the Worldfest-Houston International Film Festival. The film's producers subsequently sought a distributor for a wider release.

References

External links
 
 
 

2012 films
2012 independent films
American drama films
Drama films based on actual events
Films set in Alabama
Films set in the 1970s
Films shot in Alabama
American independent films
Films scored by Lee Holdridge
2012 drama films
2010s English-language films
2010s American films